1979 in the Philippines details events of note that happened in the Philippines in the year 1979.

Incumbents

 President: Ferdinand Marcos  (KBL)
 Prime Minister: Ferdinand Marcos (KBL)
House Speaker: Querube Makalintal
 Chief Justice:
Fred Ruiz Castro (until July 2)
Enrique Fernando (starting July 2)

Events

March
 March 29 – A fire in a discothèque and massage parlor in Manila kills 15 persons.

April
 April 10 – Presidential Decree No. 1616, an act to create an Intramuros Administration for the purpose of restoring and developing Intramuros is enacted.
 April 18 – A typhoon kills at least 12 persons, left hundreds homeless, and caused property damage estimated at $3.5 million.

May
 May 7 – Sangguniang Pampook elections are held for the Regional Legislative Assembly of the former Autonomous Regions in the Philippines which are the Region IX and Region XII.

October
 October 31 – Project Gintong Alay, a national sports program commences.

December
 December 20 – A bus plunges into a river in Isabela, killing at least 50 persons.

Holidays

As per Act No. 2711 section 29, issued on March 10, 1917, any legal holiday of fixed date falls on Sunday, the next succeeding day shall be observed as legal holiday. Sundays are also considered legal religious holidays. Bonifacio Day was added through Philippine Legislature Act No. 2946. It was signed by then-Governor General Francis Burton Harrison in 1921. On October 28, 1931, the Act No. 3827 was approved declaring the last Sunday of August as National Heroes Day. As per Republic Act No. 3022, April 9th was proclaimed as Bataan Day. Independence Day was changed from July 4 (Philippine Republic Day) to June 12 (Philippine Independence Day) on August 4, 1964.

 January 1 – New Year's Day
 February 22 – Legal Holiday
 April 9 – Araw ng Kagitingan (Day of Valor)
 April 13 – Maundy Thursday
 April 14 – Good Friday
 May 1 – Labor Day
 June 12 – Independence Day 
 July 4 – Philippine Republic Day
 August 13  – Legal Holiday
 August 26 – National Heroes Day
 September 21 – Thanksgiving Day
 November 30 – Bonifacio Day
 December 25 – Christmas Day
 December 30 – Rizal Day

Entertainment and culture

 July 30 – Eat Bulaga!,  the longest running noon-time variety show in the Philippines, premiered on RPN. It was also aired on ABS-CBN from 1989 to 1995 and on GMA Network since 1995.
 November 12 – Melanie Marquez is crowned as Miss International 1979 in the pageant night which was held in Mielparque, Tokyo, Japan.

Births
January 18 – Mark Anthony Fernandez, actor
January 21 – Rex Gatchalian, politician
January 30 – Richard "Muji" Rivera, A heavy weight bodybuilder of the 90's
January 29 – Marvin Agustin, actor, chef, and entrepreneur
March 1 – Lee Vann Corteza, pool player
March 4 – Mariz Umali, broadcast journalist
April 10 – Ryan Agoncillo, film and television actor, model and photographer
April 14 – King, singer
April 26 – Neil Ryan Sese, actor
May 11 – Eric Yap, politician
June 14 – Ren-Ren Ritualo, basketball player and coach
July 20 – Claudine Barretto, actress
August 16 – Sarah Balabagan, prisoner and singer
August 22 – Angelu De Leon actress
September 21 – Jericho Rosales, actor and singer
September 23 – Maureen Larrazabal, actress
September 24 – Julia Clarete, actress, singer, and host
October 4 – Zen Hernandez, broadcast journalist
November 19 – Mark Caguioa, basketball player
December 12 – Carlos Agassi, actor and model

Deaths
June 9 – Rudy Fernandez, labor leader
September 4 – Canuplin, Filipino stage performer and magician

References